Kyōyasai is the term for heirloom vegetables originating in Japan's Kyoto Prefecture. According to the research of the Laboratory of Health and Environment of Kyoto, Kyoyasai have more minerals, fibers and vitamins than many other vegetables. According to research, Kyoyasai have more nutrients that repair DNA than other vegetables. Kyoyasai are relatively expensive. Japanese consumers consider many Kyoyasai strange, because of their appearance.

Use 

Kyo-yasai are eaten mostly in the home or in upscale restaurants. They play an important role in Kyo-ryori, the traditional cuisine of Kyoto.

Kyo-ryori does not employ seasoning. Traditionally, Kyo-yasai are prepared without seasoning because of their rich flavor.

Kyo-yasai are also used for Italian, French and other cuisines in Kyoto.

History 

Agriculture began in Kyoto some twelve thousand years ago. It was the ancient capital of Japan and the home to the aristocracy. They supported a market for high-grade food. Kyoto is surrounded by mountains, making it difficult to transport seafood to the area. Instead, people cultivated the most delicious vegetables possible. The climate and soil quality contributed to making delicious vegetables.

In the Kamakura period, Zen Buddhism became popular. At that time Kyoto hosted many temples. Many practiced syōjin ryōri, a Buddhist vegetarian diet. This improved the quality of vegetables and preparation methods.

In 1960 the name Kyō-yasai was adopted. In the 1970s the vegetables lost popularity as imported vegetables replaced them. Such vegetables were easier to cook than Kyō-yasai, leaving Kyō-yasai on the verge of extinction.

Kyoto-area growers improved their products so that people could easily cook them. They made them smaller without losing flavor and spread new methods of cooking. Administrative organizations cooperated with agricultural and distribution organizations, attempting to increase sales of Kyō-yasai. In 1989, they started to certify Kyō-yasai as name-brand products. They also promoted Kyō-yasai to other cities.

Definition 

The most general definition covers all vegetables grown in Kyoto prefecture. More limited definitions include: Dentou no Kyō-yasai (Traditional Kyo-yasai) that originated before the Meiji period and were grown throughout Kyoto. Bracken, springs[?], extinct species and bamboo are also included according to the agricultural cooperative JA Kyoto. In this sense they are a type of heirloom vegetable This provision was made in 1988.

Nineteen species are included.

Marketing by A-Coop Kyoto and JA Kyoto 

A-Coop Kyoto and JA Kyoto made efforts to build a commercial market around Kyo-yasai, including 39 species. A survey found that Kyotans recognize Kyo-yasai as “traditional and historical food,” and most consumer emphasize its brand more than its flavor and nutrition. Kyoto City government started promoting the foods in 1998 followed shortly by Kyoto Prefecture also promoting Kyo-yasai foods in 1999.

Kyoto City appoints following 41 products as “Kyo-no-shunyasai (Kyoto vegetables in season):”

These are cultivated in Kyoto City.

Kyoto's main purpose for doing this is to popularize Kyo-yasai and to boost the competitiveness of agricultural products. Kyoto Prefecture appoints 21 products as “Brand products of Kyoto:”

The Kyo-yasai market is working on circulating Kyo-yasai across Japan by setting up satellite shops.

See also
 Japanese cuisine

References 

Agriculture in Japan
Kyoto